Alekto (minor planet designation: 465 Alekto) is a main-belt asteroid. It was discovered by Max Wolf on January 13, 1901. Its provisional name was 1901 FW. It is named for Alecto from Greek Mythology.

References

External links
 
 

Background asteroids
Alekto
Alekto
19010113